Marcusenius is a genus of elephantfishes native to Africa.

The genus is named after Johann Marcusen.

Species

There are currently 46 recognized species in this genus:

 Marcusenius abadii (Boulenger 1901) (Djebba mormyrid)
 Marcusenius altisambesi B. J. Kramer, P. H. Skelton, van der Bank & Wink 2007 (bulldog)
 Marcusenius angolensis (Boulenger 1905) (Quanza mormyrid)
 Marcusenius annamariae (Parenzan 1939) (Annamaria mormyrid)
 Marcusenius bentleyi (Boulenger 1897) (Bentley's mormyrid)
 Marcusenius brucii (Boulenger 1910) (Ogun mormyrid)
 Marcusenius caudisquamatus Maake, Gon & Swartz 2014 (Mhlatuze mormyrid)
 Marcusenius cuangoanus (Poll 1967) (Zovo mormyrid)
 Marcusenius cyprinoides (Linnaeus, 1758) (thicklipped trunkfish)
 Marcusenius deboensis (Daget 1954) (Debo mormyrid)
 Marcusenius desertus B. J. Kramer, van der Bank & Wink 2016 (Cunene elephantfish)
 Marcusenius devosi B. J. Kramer, P. H. Skelton, van der Bank & Wink 2007 (Wenje mormyrid)
 Marcusenius dundoensis (Poll 1967) (Dundo mormyrid)
 Marcusenius friteli (Pellegrin 1904) (Alima mormyrid)
 Marcusenius furcidens (Pellegrin 1920) (Ivory Coast mormyrid)
 Marcusenius fuscus (Pellegrin 1901)
 Marcusenius ghesquierei (Poll 1945) (Busira mormyrid)
 Marcusenius gracilis B. J. Kramer 2013 (Comoe mormyrid)
 Marcusenius greshoffii (Schilthuis 1891) (Greshoff's mormyrid)
 Marcusenius intermedius Pellegrin 1924 (Kasai mormyrid)
 Marcusenius kainjii D. S. C. Lewis 1974 (Lowa elephantfish)
 Marcusenius kaninginii Kisekelwa Boden, Snoeks & Vreven 2016
 Marcusenius krameri Maake, Gon & Swartz 2014 (Kramer's mormyrid)
 Marcusenius kutuensis (Boulenger 1899) (Kutu Island mormyrid)
 Marcusenius leopoldianus (Boulenger 1899) (Ibali Island mormyrid)
 Marcusenius livingstonii (Boulenger 1899) (Livingston's bulldog)
 Marcusenius lucombesi Maake, Gon & Swartz 2014 (Lucombe mormyrid)
 Marcusenius macrolepidotus (W. K. H. Peters 1852) (Bulldog)
 Marcusenius macrophthalmus (Pellegrin 1924) (Tshikapa mormyrid)
 Marcusenius mento (Boulenger 1890)
 Marcusenius meronai Bigorne & Paugy 1990 (Sierra Leone mormyrid)
 Marcusenius monteiri (Günther 1873) (Monteiri's bulldog)
 Marcusenius moorii (Günther 1867) (Talagouga mormyrid)
 Marcusenius multisquamatus B. J. Kramer & Wink 2013 (Epupa Falls mormyrid)
 Marcusenius ntemensis (Pellegrin 1927) (Ntem mormyrid)
 Marcusenius nyasensis (Worthington 1933)
 Marcusenius pongolensis (Fowler 1934) (Southern bulldog)
 Marcusenius rheni (Fowler 1936)
 Marcusenius sanagaensis Boden, Teugels & C. D. Hopkins 1997 (Cameroon mormyrid)
 Marcusenius schilthuisiae (Boulenger 1899) (Kutu mormyrid)
 Marcusenius senegalensis (Steindachner 1870) (Trunkfish; Senegalese mormyrid)
 Marcusenius stanleyanus (Boulenger 1897) (Boyoma mormyrid)
 Marcusenius thomasi (Boulenger 1916) (Sherbo mormyrid)
 Marcusenius ussheri (Günther 1867) (Bossumprah mormyrid)
 Marcusenius victoriae (Worthington 1929) (Victoria stonebasher)
Marcusenius wamuinii

References 

 
Ray-finned fish genera
Taxonomy articles created by Polbot